Virgibacillus halotolerans is a Gram-positive, strictly aerobic and weakly motile bacterium from the genus of Virgibacillus which has been isolated from a dairy product from Bavaria in Germany.

References

Bacillaceae
Bacteria described in 2013